Universidad de Chile Femenino is a Chilean women's football club from Santiago representing Club Universidad de Chile in the Chilean women's championship. It was founded in 2008.

Universidad de Chile has won the 2016 Apertura Championship.

The team made its debut on Copa Libertadores Femenina 2020 in Argentina in March 2021. Eventually it reached semi-final.

Nicholás Bravo is the current manager of the team.

Honours

Domestic
 Primera División: 2
 2016-A.
 2021.

Players

Current squad
As of Apr 2022

References

Club Universidad de Chile
Universidad de Chile
Sport in Santiago
2008 establishments in Chile